Cincinnati is a city in Appanoose County, Iowa, United States. The population was 290 in the 2020 census, a decline from 428 in 2000.

Geography
Cincinnati's longitude and latitude coordinatesin decimal form are 40.630309, −92.923734.

The assigned ZIP code of the city is 52549.

History
Cincinnati was platted in 1855. The town of Cincinnati was incorporated in February 1875, and named for the Ohio hometown of early resident J.H.B. Armstrong. Cincinnati was a coal mining camp, and as with many coal camps in the late 19th century, it was a hotbed of union activity, strikes and occasional violence.  Company E of the Second Regiment of the Iowa National Guard was called up on April 12, 1895, in response to a request of support from the county sheriff after threats of violence from striking miners in Cincinnati.  In 1912, Local 775 of the United Mine Workers based in Cincinnati, had 302 members.

Demographics

2010 census
As of the census of 2010, there were 357 people, 159 households, and 98 families living in the city. The racial makeup of the city was 97.5% White, 0.3% Asian, and 2.2% from two or more races. Hispanic or Latino of any race were 1.1% of the population.

There were 159 households, of which 23.3% had children under the age of 18 living with them, 49.1% were married couples living together, 8.2% had a female householder with no husband present, 4.4% had a male householder with no wife present, and 38.4% were non-families. 31.4% of all households were made up of individuals, and 15.1% had someone living alone who was 65 years of age or older. The average household size was 2.25 and the average family size was 2.85.

The median age in the city was 44.4 years. 19.9% of residents were under the age of 18; 7.6% were between the ages of 18 and 24; 23.5% were from 25 to 44; 29.7% were from 45 to 64; and 19.3% were 65 years of age or older. The gender makeup of the city was 50.1% male and 49.9% female.

2000 census
As of the census of 2000, there were 428 people, 180 households, and 113 families living in the city. The racial makeup of the city was 98.13% White, 0.23% from other races, and 1.64% from two or more races. Hispanic or Latino of any race were 1.17% of the population.

There were 180 households, out of which 30.6% had children under the age of 18 living with them, 46.7% were married couples living together, 11.1% had a female householder with no husband present, and 37.2% were non-families. 31.7% of all households were made up of individuals, and 18.9% had someone living alone who was 65 years of age or older. The average household size was 2.38 and the average family size was 3.03.

In the city, the population was spread out, with 25.0% under the age of 18, 7.9% from 18 to 24, 26.4% from 25 to 44, 21.3% from 45 to 64, and 19.4% who were 65 years of age or older. The median age was 38 years. For every 100 females, there were 86.9 males. For every 100 females age 18 and over, there were 82.4 males.

The median income for a household in the city was $26,641, and the median income for a family was $28,250. Males had a median income of $25,556 versus $19,904 for females. The per capita income for the city was $12,489. About 11.0% of families and 11.4% of the population were below the poverty line, including 9.0% of those under age 18 and 21.7% of those age 65 or over.

Education
The Centerville Community School District operates area public schools.

Notable person 
 Tudda Gunna, American Rapper  and Actors
 Rick Mathews, Major League Baseball coach and scout

References

External links

 

Cities in Appanoose County, Iowa
Cities in Iowa
1855 establishments in Iowa
Populated places established in 1855